Sheila Vand is an American actress and performance artist. She is known for her role in Ben Affleck's 2012 Oscar-winning film Argo. Vand made her Broadway debut alongside Robin Williams in 2011 in the Pulitzer-nominated Bengal Tiger at the Baghdad Zoo. She has worked with filmmaker Ana Lily Amirpour on several projects, including Pashmaloo which premiered at the Berlinale in 2011 and A Girl Walks Home Alone at Night, which premiered at the 2014 Sundance Film Festival. She also has an ongoing collaboration with 2013 TED speaker Alexa Meade. Their photo series MILK: What Will You Make of Me? is on exhibit at the Gallery for Contemporary Photography Ingo Seufert, Munich, Germany and was also exhibited in the Grand Palais at Art Paris Art Fair. Vand is also the creator of experimental performance piece Sneaky Nietzsche.

Early life 
Sheila Vand was born in a suburb of Los Angeles, but grew up in Palo Alto, California. She is a second-generation Iranian-American. 

She graduated from the UCLA School of Theater, Film and Television, where she studied acting and directing.

Career 
In 2009, Vand originated the role of Hadia in Rajiv Joseph's Bengal Tiger at the Baghdad Zoo, which moved to Broadway in 2011. In 2010, she debuted Sneaky Nietzsche, which she called "a live theatrical music experience for the fictionally-inclined." It was described by the Los Angeles Times as "stepping into a living, changing art piece" and by LA Weekly as an "all-encompassing, sensory overload. In a good way." Vand was commissioned by LACMA in 2011 to remount Sneaky Nietzsche.

Vand played the role of Sahar the Iranian housekeeper in Argo and she also narrates the beginning of the film. Her performance was highlighted in the LA Times annual piece "Small Roles, Powerful Performances" and she was a recipient of a SAG Outstanding Ensemble Award in 2013.

In 2012, Vand began collaborating with painter/photographer Alexa Meade. Their first joint series MILK: What Will You Make of Me? has been featured in The Huffington Post, Wired, Juxtapoz magazine, and at the 2013 TED Global Conference.

She played the female lead in the 2013 CBS pilot for Beverly Hills Cop, but the show was not picked up to series.

Vand made her Walt Disney Concert Hall debut in 2013, performing with the Los Angeles Philharmonic in the world premiere of Frank Zappa's 200 Motels under the baton of Maestro Esa-Pekka Salonen. She played the role of Lucy opposite Diva Zappa.

Vand plays the title role in A Girl Walks Home Alone at Night, which premiered at the 2014 Sundance Film Festival.

Vand also had a regular role in NBC's short-lived State of Affairs (2014) – cast as Maureen James, she is CIA Secretary of Defense briefer and best friend to the show's lead, Charleston "Charlie" Tucker (Katherine Heigl).

Vand played Fredi Kincaid in the Minority Report (2015) episode "Fredi", who is thought to be a potential murder victim in Dash's vision.

Filmography

Film

Television

References

External links 
 
 MILK: what will you make of me?

Living people
American film actresses
American stage actresses
American television actresses
American voice actresses
Actresses from Palo Alto, California
Actresses from Los Angeles
American people of Iranian descent
21st-century American actresses
UCLA Film School alumni
Year of birth missing (living people)